Acacia ancistrocarpa, commonly known as fitzroy wattle, is a shrub belonging to the genus Acacia and the subgenus Juliflorae. The shrub is also known as fish hook wattle, pindan wattle and shiny leaved wattle.

The Walmajarri people of the Paruku IPA in the Kimberley call this wattle, Kampuka.

Description
It flowers from March to August  producing yellow flowers. It has multiple stems and a spreading obconic habit. The ultimate branchlets can sometimes be sub-pendulous. The grey bark is mostly smooth but can become fissured longitudinally at the base of mature stems.

Taxonomy
The species was first formally described by the botanists Joseph Maiden and William Blakely in 1928 as part of the work Descriptions of fifty new species and six varieties of western and northern Australian Acacias, and notes on four other species published in the Journal of the Royal Society of Western Australia.

The species name is taken from the Greek word ankistron meaning fish-hook and karpos meaning fruit referring to the hooked tip of the pod.

The type specimen was collected between Minderoo and Globe Hill Station along the Ashburton River in the Pilbara region of Western Australia in 1905 by A.Morrison.

Acacia ancistrocarpa is known to form hybrids with Acacia trachycarpa.

Distribution
It is native to the Northern Territory and the Pilbara and Kimberley regions of Western Australia, its range extends into far western Queensland. The plant will grown in acidic red sandy soils or skeletal soils and is often found on plains, along creeks, pindan or stony plains usually in spinifex communities.
Mostly it will not form dense stands but regenerates readily from seed after ground disturbances or bushfires and then can produce reasonably dense populations.

See also
List of Acacia species

References

ancistrocarpa
Acacias of Western Australia
Plants described in 1928
Flora of the Northern Territory
Flora of Queensland
Taxa named by Joseph Maiden
Taxa named by William Blakely